Only Trust Your Heart is the second studio album by Canadian singer Diana Krall, released on February 14, 1995, by GRP Records.

Track listing

Personnel
Credits adapted from the liner notes of Only Trust Your Heart.

Musicians
 Diana Krall – vocals ; piano 
 Ray Brown – bass 
 Christian McBride – bass 
 Lewis Nash – drums
 Stanley Turrentine – tenor saxophone

Technical

 Tommy LiPuma – production
 Carl Griffin – executive production
 Al Schmitt – recording, mixing
 Rich Lamb – engineering assistance
 Scott Austin – engineering assistance
 Doug Sax – mastering
 Gavin Lurssen – mastering
 Michael Landy – post-production
 Joseph Doughney – post-production
 Cara Bridgins – production coordination
 Joseph Moore – production coordination assistance

Artwork
 Carol Weinberg – photography
 Sonny Mediana – studio photos
 Hollis King – art direction
 Freddie Paloma – graphic design
 Michael Bourne – liner notes

Charts

References

External links
 

1995 albums
Albums produced by Tommy LiPuma
Covers albums
Diana Krall albums
GRP Records albums